William John Burke, Burkauskas (polonized Burkowski) (December 14, 1902 – April 19, 1972) was an American professional golfer during the early 20th century.

Early life 
Burke was born in Naugatuck, Connecticut. He was of Lithuanian descent.

Professional career 
His greatest season was 1931, when he won the U.S. Open, reached the semi-finals of the PGA Championship, and won four events on the professional circuit, plus appeared on the Ryder Cup team where he was undefeated in two matches. He was also selected for the 1933 Ryder Cup team but not before some agitation by Gene Sarazen was done on his behalf. Burke won his only match in the 1933 competition.

Burke's 1931 U.S. Open win came in a marathon playoff. He and George Von Elm were tied at 292 (8-over-par) after regulation play. They played a 36-hole playoff the next day and tied again at 149 (7-over-par). The following day they played 36 more holes and Burke emerged victorious 148 to 149.

Throughout Burke's golf career he used an unorthodox grip due to the loss of two fingers on his left hand. In 2005, Burke was inducted into the National Polish-American Sports Hall of Fame. Burke died in Clearwater, Florida, in 1972.

Professional wins (17)

PGA Tour wins (13)
1927 (2) Florida Open, Central Florida Open
1928 (1) North and South Open
1929 (2) New York State Open, Glens Falls Open
1930 (1) Mid South Open
1931 (2) U.S. Open, Glens Falls Open
1932 (1) Florida West Coast Open
1935 (1) The Cascades Open
1936 (1) Centennial Open
1939 (1) Walter Hagen 25th Anniversary (with Ed Dudley)
1940 (1) Miami Biltmore International Four-Ball (with Craig Wood)

Major championship is shown in bold.

Other wins (4)
this list may be incomplete
1938 Ohio Open
1939 Ohio Open
1945 Ohio Open
1955 Ohio Open

Major championships

Wins (1)

1 Defeated George Von Elm in a playoff. First 36-hole playoff - Burke 73-76=149 (+7), Von Elm 75-74=149 (+7). Second 36-hole playoff - Burke 71-77=148 (+6), Von Elm 76-73=149 (+7).

Results timeline

Note: Burke never played in The Open Championship.

NYF = tournament not yet founded
NT = no tournament
WD = withdrew
CUT = missed the half-way cut
R64, R32, R16, QF, SF = round in which player lost in PGA Championship match play
"T" indicates a tie for a place

Summary

Most consecutive cuts made – 12 (1934 Masters – 1938 Masters)
Longest streak of top-10s – 3 (1931 U.S. Open – 1932 U.S. Open)

See also
List of golfers with most PGA Tour wins

References

American male golfers
PGA Tour golfers
Winners of men's major golf championships
Ryder Cup competitors for the United States
Golfers from Connecticut
American people of Polish descent
People from Naugatuck, Connecticut
Sportspeople from New Haven County, Connecticut
1902 births
1972 deaths